Just Dance Wii 2 is a 2012 dance rhythm game developed by Ubisoft Paris and published by Nintendo. It is part of the Just Dance video game series published by Ubisoft and the second Japanese installment of the series. It was announced in a Nintendo Direct on 21 April 2012 and released for the Wii system on 26 July 2012 in Japan.

Gameplay

The game is based on Just Dance 3, with the user interface and features are largely identical to that said game, but the game removes a few features and adds a Dance Dojo mode, which allows the player to study some or all of a routine. Players can also choose between the full version or the short version.

Track list 
The game features 35 songs, including twenty Japanese songs.

Reception

Famitsu gave the game a score of 33/40, with three out of four reviewers giving it an 8 and the other reviewer giving it a 9.

Notes

References

2012 video games
Just Dance (video game series)
Dance video games
Fitness games
Japan-exclusive video games
Music video games
Ubisoft games
Video games developed in France
Wii games
Multiplayer and single-player video games